Isturgia miniosaria is a species of moth in the  family Geometridae. It is found in France, Spain and Portugal. It is also found in North Africa, including Morocco.

The larvae feed on the flowers of Genista  and Ulex species.

References

External links

Lepiforum.de

Moths described in 1829
Macariini
Moths of Europe
Taxa named by Philogène Auguste Joseph Duponchel